Wormwood, originally published as Swamp Foetus, is a collection of short stories by American horror fiction author Poppy Z. Brite. It was first published by Borderlands Press, a small-press publisher of horror fiction, in 1993. It was reprinted by Penguin Books in 1995, and reprinted and retitled in 1996 by Dell Publishing.

Contents
"A Prolegomena to Any Future Metaphysics of Poppy", introduction by Dan Simmons
"Angels"
"A Georgia Story"
"His Mouth Will Taste of Wormwood"
"Optional Music for Voice and Piano"
"Xenophobia"
"The Sixth Sentinel"
"Missing"
"Footprints in the Water"
"How to Get Ahead in New York"
"Calcutta, Lord of Nerves" (1993 World Fantasy Award nominee, Best Short Fiction)
"The Elder"
"The Ash of Memory, the Dust of Desire" (1991 Bram Stoker Award nominee, Best Short Fiction)

Selected edition
His Mouth Will Taste of Wormwood and Other Stories (Penguin Books, 1995, 96 pages) comprises four stories selected from Swamp Foetus (aka Wormwood): "His Mouth Will Taste of Wormwood", "The Sixth Sentinel", "Calcutta, Lord of Nerves", and "How To Get Ahead in New York".

References

1993 short story collections
Bisexuality-related fiction
Short story collections by Poppy Z. Brite